Connie Munk is an American politician and former counselor, who served as a member of the Nevada Assembly, where she represented the 4th district.

Early life and education 
Munk was born in 1951 in Burke, South Dakota. She graduated from Dallas High School in Dallas, Oregon. In 2004, she earned a Bachelor of Science in Human Services from Montana State University.

Career 
Prior to her career in politics, monk worked as an addiction counselor, real estate agent, mortgage loan broker, and small-business owner. Munk was elected to the Nevada Assembly in 2018, defeating incumbent Republican Richard McArthur. She represented the 4th district, which covers a portion of Las Vegas. On November 3, 2020, Munk unsuccessfully ran for re-elected, and was defeated by McArthur.

References 

Montana State University alumni
People from Burke, South Dakota
Democratic Party members of the Nevada Assembly
1951 births
Women state legislators in Nevada
Living people
21st-century American politicians
21st-century American women politicians